Callibotys is a genus of moths of the family Crambidae.

Species
Callibotys carapina (Strand, 1918)
Callibotys hyalodiscalis (Warren, 1896)
Callibotys wilemani Munroe & Mutuura, 1969

References

Pyraustinae
Crambidae genera
Taxa named by Eugene G. Munroe